Max Lorenz (born 19 August 1939) is a German former footballer who played as a midfielder. He spent most of his career with Werder Bremen, making 250 league appearances in nine years at the club and winning the Bundesliga in the 1964–65 season. He spent three years at Eintracht Braunschweig. At international level, he made 19 appearances scoring one goal for the West Germany national team.

Club career 
Lorenz was born in Bremen. He played 250 West German top-flight matches.

International career 
Lorenz represented West Germany at the 1970 FIFA World Cup. He was also an unused squad member of the DFB team at the 1966 FIFA World Cup. Between 1965 and 1970 he won 19 caps for West Germany.

Honours
Werder Bremen
 Bundesliga: 1964–65

 DFB-Pokal: 1960–61

References

External links
 
 
 
 

Living people
1939 births
German footballers
Association football midfielders
Germany international footballers
1966 FIFA World Cup players
1970 FIFA World Cup players
SV Werder Bremen players
Eintracht Braunschweig players
Bundesliga players